The Royal Bengal Tiger is an Indian Bengali suspense thriller film directed by Rajesh Ganguly, written and produced by Neeraj Pandey.It is based on Chuck Palahniuk's famous novel 'Fight Club'. The film stars Abir Chatterjee, Priyanka Sarkar, Shraddha Das and Jeet. The film received positive reviews from critics and turned out to be commercially successful. The film has only one song, sung by Timir Biswas. The film premiered in Kolkata on 1 February 2014.

Synopsis
Abhi (Abir Chatterjee) is a meek Bengali family man who does not know how to fight. He lives in Kolkata with his wife Apu (Priyanka Sarkar) and his son. He has a tenant Mr. Pakrashi (Kharaj Mukherjee) who has not paid rent for six months. He simply walks away. In his office Abhi is a hardworker. His colleague Deepankar (Shantilal Mukherjee) is jealous of him and plans his downfall, but his other colleague Nandini (Shraddha Das) is a friend and sympathiser. During Abhi's birthday morning he asked his tenant to pay up, but gets slapped in the middle of the road by him.

Abhi goes to his office only to learn that all his files have been messed up by someone and one important file of payment is missing. He works the whole night on them only to be sabotaged by Deepankar again. That night while Abhi was returning with Nandini she gets molested by some goons at the metro station. She cries to Abhi for help, but Abhi cannot fight. Nandini boards the metro crying. leaving Abhi at the station.

Abhi is ashamed. He meets his friend Anjan (Jeet)  and narrates the story and about his helplessness. Anjan takes him to a coffee house and encourages him, causing him to shrug off his fear. They both visit his office to search for the missing file. Finding nothing, they ransack the office and run away.

While returning home he learns that Pakrashi is boozing with friends. Angrily he enters the house and beats Pakrashi black and blue and forces him to pay up.

The next day Nandini rejects Abhi's proposal for boarding a metro and taunts him. Abhi drops his office bag accidentally in the road. Abhi tells Anjan and they both run towards the metro station and Abhi starts beating up the molesters.

The next day he meets Anjan again and Anjan gives him his contact number. At his office Abhi is shocked when he learns that Deepankar has been promoted. Unable to bear this Abhi suspects that he has been tricked. He hunts Deepankar down that night and beats him up. His rival confesses that he had stolen the payment file and hid it in his home. Anjan asks Abhi that since Deepankar has made his file disappear, he should in turn make Deepankar disappear. Abhi ties Deepankar up and throws him on the highway where he is killed. Meanwhile, Apu and her  psychiatrist father, travel to the police station where they recover the bag and inform them he is still missing, Apu's father discloses that Abhi is a psychiatric patient suffering from schizophrenia. While the discussion continues, the police receive the news of Abhi sitting with Deepankar's corpse. The police bring him in where it is revealed that the character, Anjan doesn't exist. He is just an imagination of Abhi.

Cast

 Jeet as Anjan Sen (extended special appearance)
 Abir Chatterjee as Abhiroop
 Priyanka Sarkar as Apu
 Shraddha Das as Nandini
 Kharaj Mukherjee as Mr.Pakrashi, Abhi's tenant
 Rajesh Sharma as GC Bagchi
 Shantilal Mukherjee as Deepankar
 Barun Chanda as Dr. Bagchi
 Tanima Sen as the woman in the metro
 Chandan Sen

Critical response
The film have got mostly positive response from critics and audience alike. It was a box office hit.

References

External links
 

Bengali-language Indian films
2010s Bengali-language films
2014 films
Films scored by Sanjoy Chowdhury
Viacom18 Studios films